Malik Amin Aslam (born November 27, 1966) is a Pakistani environmentalist and politician who served as Federal Minister and Adviser to former Prime Minister of Pakistan Imran Khan for Climate Change. He also serves as Vice President in IUCN.

He is a notable personality in Attock District. He has previously Chaired the flagship Green Growth Initiative for the KPK in Pakistan from 2013 till 2018 which included the mass a forestation “Billion Tree Tsunami” project.

Personal life and education 
Malik Amin Aslam was born in Noble Family Of Awan (tribe) in Karachi on November 27, 1966.  He was brought up in a political family. His family has been in politics for three generations. His father served as member of National Assembly from Attock thrice and was the Punjab revenue minister.  He got his early education from Aitchison College. He later moved to Lahore in 1990 to study for the degree of BSc in Electrical Engineering for UET Lahore. For higher education he went abroad to get MBA in Finance from McGill University in 1993 and a MSc in Environmental Management from University of Oxford in 1996. According to the official profile on Minister of Climate Change Government of Pakistan completed his thesis on the utility of the “emissions trading” concept within the context of managing the Climate Change issue. He is also a member of the International Editorial Board of Climate Policy Journal since 1998. He is married with and is a father two sons and a daughter. His hobbies are scuba diving and sky diving.

Professional life 
After studies, Malik Amin Aslam worked as the private consultant with the World Bank and United Nations on environmental issues. His area of expertise is climate change and has written a number of articles and  co-authored two books that have been published by the World Resource Institute in Washington, D.C. He was also on the National Environmental Advisory Board and the Environmental Protection Council before entering politics. He considers himself a technocrat-turned-politician. An agriculturist/environment consultant by profession, he has also served as a member of the UN Working Group on Climate Change since 1997. On Sep 13,2011, he was elected to serve on the governing council of International Union for Conservation of Nature for a four-year term in 2012. He was re-elected as Regional Councillor for Asia (2016-2020) at the World Conservation Congress held in Hawaii (September 2016). He also chaired the flagship "Green Growth initiative" for the province of KPK in Pakistan – which included the mass afforestation "Billion Tree Tsunami" project. He was also chosen to serve on the high level "International Advisory Council" for the Eco-Forum Global. In August 2018, Prime Minister Imran Khan nominated Malik as Advisor on Climate Change.
On March 23, 2019, Malik was honored with the Tamgha-e-Imtiaz by the President of Pakistan Arif Alvi for his efforts in implementing the Billion Tree Tsunami and his work for the environment.

Politics 
He began his political career at the time when Islamic Republic of Pakistan under the control of military dictator Pervez Musharaf. He first successfully ran in local elections from Attock, Punjab, Pakistan, in 2001.

General Elections - 2002 
A year later, under the military regime he became an elected Member of National Assembly after the controversial election of 2002 and served as Minister of State for Environment. He ran on the ticket of Pakistan Muslim League (Q) from NA-57 (Attock-I). His tenure ended in 2007.

General Elections - 2008 
In the general elections of 2008, he contested independently and lost with the margin of almost 200 votes] .

General Elections - 2013 
He re-joined Pakistan Tehreek-e-Insaaf on November 19, 2011. He ran for same seat in general elections of 2013 but lost to Sheikh Aftab Ahmed from Pakistan Muslim League (N).

General Elections - 2018 
Attock was considered an important seat in 2018 elections. During this time Imran Khan embraced Major(r) Tahir Sadiq Khan, a powerful political personality, joined Pakistan Tehreek-e-Insaaf. This opened up a lot of speculations among the locals about who would get the party ticket. In the end Imran Khan decided to give the ticket to Major(r) Tahir Sadiq. The supporters of Malik Amin Aslam were in shock over the denial of NA ticket to him from Attock. Few days after the announcement of the party ticket, at a function, Imran Khan showered praise on Malik Amin Aslam for making the Billion Tree Tsunami project a great success and promised to make him federal minister for environment after the elections.
Malik Amin Aslam Khan mostly remains frustrated due to his defeat from Major Tahir Sadiq

Nomination for Reserved Seat 
Prime Minister Imran Khan fulfilled his promise in August 2018, when he nominated Malik Amin Aslam for the Reserved Seat of Adviser for Climate Change to the Prime Minister of Pakistan. This decision was very well received by the local environmentalists.

References

Pakistan Tehreek-e-Insaf politicians
Living people
Punjabi people
1966 births
Alumni of the University of Oxford
McGill University Faculty of Management alumni
Pakistani environmentalists
Pakistani activists
People from Attock District
Aitchison College alumni
Recipients of Tamgha-e-Imtiaz
University of Engineering and Technology, Lahore alumni